Civil parishes in Ireland are based on the medieval Christian parishes, adapted by the English administration and by the Church of Ireland. The parishes, their division into townlands and their grouping into baronies, were recorded in the Down Survey undertaken in 1656-58 by surveyors under William Petty. The purpose was primarily cadastral, recording land boundaries and ownership. The civil parishes are not administrative units. They differ from Catholic parishes, which are generally larger.

Antrim 
There are 77 civil parishes in County Antrim.

Aghagallon
Aghalee
Ahoghill
Antrim
Ardclinis
Armoy
Ballinderry
Ballintoy
Ballyclug
Ballycor
Ballylinny
Ballymartin
Ballymoney
Ballynure
Ballyrashane
Ballyscullion
Ballyscullion Grange
Ballywillin
Billy
Blaris
Camlin
Carncastle
Carnmoney
Carrickfergus (or St Nicholas)
Connor
Cranfield
Culfeightrin
Derryaghy
Derrykeighan
Doagh Grange
Donegore
Drumbeg
Drummaul
Drumtullagh, Grange of
Dunaghy
Dundermot, Grange of
Duneane
Dunluce
Finvoy
Glenavy
Glenwhirry
Glynn
Inver
Island Magee
Kilbride
Kildollagh
killinaskully
Killead
Killyglen, Grange of
Kilraghts
Kilroot
Kilwaughter
Kirkinriola
Lambeg
Larne
Layd
Layd (Grange of Inispollan)
Layd (Grange of Layd)
Loughguile
Magheragall
Magheramesk
Muckamore, Grange of
Newton Crommelin
Nilteen, Grange of
Racavan
Raloo
Ramoan
Rasharkin
Rashee
Rathlin
Shilvodan, Grange of
Skerry
Templecorran
Templepatrick
Tickmacrevan
Tullaghgore
Tullyrusk

Armagh 
There are 28 civil parishes in County Armagh.

Armagh
Ballymore
Ballymyre
Clonfeacle
Creggan
Derrynoose
Drumcree
Eglish
Forkill
Grange
Jonesborough
Keady
Kilclooney
Killevy
Killyman
Kilmore
Lisnadill
Loughgall
Loughgilly
Magheralin
Montiaghs
Mullaghbrack
Newry
Newtown Hamilton
Seagoe
Shankill
Tartaraghan
Tynan

Carlow
There are 47 civil parishes in County Carlow.

Agha 
Aghade 
Ardoyne
Ardristan 
Ballinacarrig 
Ballon
Ballycrogue 
Ballyellin 
Baltinglass 
Barragh 
Carlow 
Clonmelsh 
Clonmore 
Clonygoose 
Cloydagh 
Crecrin 
Dunleckny 
Fennagh 
Gilbertstown 
Grangeford 
Hacketstown 
Haroldstown 
Kellistown 
Killerrig 
Killinane 
Kiltegan 
Kiltennell 
Kineagh 
Lorum 
Moyacomb 
Myshall 
Nurney 
Oldleighlin
Painestown
Rahill
Rathmore
Rathvilly 
Sliguff
St Mullin's 
Straboe 
Templepeter 
Tullowcreen 
Tullowmagimma 
Tullowphelim 
Ullard 
Urglin
Wells

Cavan
There are 36 civil parishes in County Cavan.

Annagelliff
Annagh
Bailieborough
Ballintemple
Ballymachugh
Castlerahan
Castleterra
Crosserlough
Denn
Drumgoon
Drumlane
Drumlumman
Drumreilly
Drung
Enniskeen
Kilbride
Kildallan
Kildrumsherdan
Killeshandra
Killinagh
Killinkere
Kilmore
Kinawley
Knockbride
Larah
Lavey
Loughan or Castlekeeran
Lurgan
Moybolgue
Mullagh
Munterconnaught
Scrabby
Shercock
Templeport
Tomregan
Urney

Clare
There are 81 civil parishes in County Clare.

 Abbey
 Bunratty
 Carran
 Clareabbey
 Clondagad
 Clonlea
 Clonloghan
 Clonrush
 Clooney (Bunratty Upper)
 Clooney (Corcomroe)
 Doora
 Drumcliff
 Drumcreehy
 Drumline
 Dysert (now part of Ruan)
 Feakle
 Feenagh
 Gleninagh
 Inagh
 Inchicronan
 Inishcaltra
 Kilballyowen
 Kilchreest
 Kilconry
 Kilcorney
 Kilfarboy
 Kilfearagh
 Kilfenora
 Kilfiddane
 Kilfinaghta
 Kilfintinan
 Kilkeedy
 Killadysert
 Killaloe
 Killard
 Killaspuglonane
 Killeany
 Killeely
 Killilagh
 Killimer
 Killinaboy
 Killofin
 Killokennedy
 Killonaghan
 Killone
 Killuran
 Kilmacduane
 Kilmacrehy
 Kilmaleery
 Kilmaley
 Kilmanaheen
 Kilmihil
 Kilmoon
 Kilmurry McMahon
 Kilmurry Ibrickane
 Kilmurry-Negaul
 Kilnamona
 Kilnasoolagh
 Kilnoe
 Kilraghtis
 Kilrush
 Kilseily
 Kilshanny
 Kiltenanlea
 Kiltoraght
 Moyarta
 Moynoe
 Noughaval
 O'Brien's Bridge
 Ogonnelloe
 Oughtmama
 Quin
 Rath
 Rathborney
 Ruan
 St. Munchin's
 St. Patrick's
 Templemaley
 Tomfinlough
 Tomgraney
 Tulla

Cork
There are 250 civil parishes in County Cork. Baronies are in parentheses where the name occurs more than once in the county.

East
There are 111 civil parishes in East Cork.

Aghacross
Aghada
Aghern
Ardagh
Ardnageehy
Ballintemple
Ballycurrany
Ballydeloher
Ballydeloughy
Ballyfeard
Ballyfoyle
Ballyhooly
Ballynoe
Ballyoughtera
Ballyspillane
Barnahely
Bohillane
Bridgetown
Brigown
Britway
Caherlag
Carrigaline
Carrigdownane
Carrigleamleary
Carrigtwohill
Castlelyons
Castletownroche
Clenor
Clondulane
Clonmel
Clonmult
Clonpriest
Cloyne
Coole
Corkbeg
Cullen (Kinalea)
Dangandonovan
Derryvillane
Doneraile
Dunbulloge
Dungourney
Dunmahon
Farahy
Fermoy
Garranekinnefeake
Garryvoe
Glanworth
Gortroe
Ightermurragh
Imogeely
Inch
Inchinabackey
Kilcredan
Kilcrumper
Kilcully
Kilcummer
Kildorrery
Kilgullane
Killanully
Killaspugmullane
Killathy
Killeagh
Killeenemer
Kilmacdonogh
Kilmahon
Kilmoney
Kilmonoge
Kilpatrick
Kilphelan
Kilquane (Barrymore)
Kilshanahan
Kilworth
Kinure
Knockmourne
Leitrim
Liscleary
Lisgoold
Lismore and Mocollop
Litter
Little Island
Macroney
Marmullane
Marshalstown
Midleton
Mogeely
Mogeesha
Monanimy
Monkstown
Nohoval
Rahan
Rathcooney
Rathcormack
Rostellan
St. Michaels
St. Nathlash
Templebodan
Templebreedy
Templemolaga
Templenacarriga
Templeroan
Templerobin
Templeusque
Titeskin
Trabolgan
Tracton
Wallstown
Youghal

North-West
There are 71 civil parishes in North-West Cork.

Aghabullogue
Aghinagh
Aglish
Aglishdrinagh
Ardskeagh
Athnowen
Ballyclogh
Ballyhay
Ballyvourney
Bregoge
Buttevant
Caherduggan
Cannaway
Carrigrohane
Carrigrohanebeg
Castlemagner
Churchtown
Clondrohid
Clonfert
Clonmeen
Cooliney
Corbally
Corcomhide
Cullen (Duhallow)
Currykippane
Desertmore
Donoughmore (Muskerry)
Drishane
Dromtarriff
Drumdowney
Duniskey
Garrycloyne
Grenagh
Hackmys
Imphrick
Inchigeelagh
Inishcarra
Inishkenny
Kilbolane
Kilbonane
Kilbrin
Kilbroney
Kilcorcoran
Kilcorney
Kilgrogan
Kilmaclenine
Kilmeen (Duhallow)
Kilmichael
Kilmurry
Kilnaglory
Kilnamartyra
Kilquane (Fermoy)
Kilroe
Kilshannig
Knocktemple
Lackeen
Liscarroll
Macloneigh
Macroom
Magourney
Mallow
Matehy
Mourneabbey
Moviddy
Nohavaldaly
Rathgoggan
Roskeen
Shandrum
Subulter
Tullylease
Whitechurch

West

There are 68 civil parishes in West Cork.

Abbeymahon
Abbeystrowry
Aghadown
Ardfield
Ballinaboy
Ballinadee
Ballymartle
Ballymodan
Ballymoney
Brinny
Caheragh
Castlehaven
Castleventry
Clear-Island
Clontead
Creagh
Desert
Desertserges
Donaghmore 
Drinagh
Dromdaleague
Dunderrow
Durrus
Fanlobbus
Inishannon
Island
Kilbrittain
Kilbrogan
Kilcaskan
Kilcatherine
Kilcoe
Kilcrohane
Kilfaughnabeg
Kilgarriff
Kilkerranmore
Killaconenagh
Killowen
Kilmacabea
Kilmaloda
Kilmeen (East Carbery)
Kilmocomoge
Kilmoe
Kilnagross
Kilnamanagh
Kilroan
Kilsillagh
Kinneigh
Kinsale
Knockavilly
Leighmoney
Lislee
Murragh
Myross
Rathbarry
Rathclarin
Ringcurran
Ringrone
Ross
Skull
Templebryan
Templemartin
Templemichael
Templeomalus
Templequinlan
Templetrine
Timoleague
Tisaxon
Tullagh

Donegal
There are 52 civil parishes in County Donegal:

Aghanunshin
Allsaints
Aughnish
Burt
Clonca
Clondahorky
Clondavaddog
Clonleigh
Clonmany
Convoy
Conwal
Culdaff
Desertegny
Donagh
Donaghmore
Donegal
Drumhome
Fahan Lower
Fahan Upper
Gartan
Glencolmcille
Inch
Inishkeel
Inishmacsaint
Inver
Kilbarron
Kilcar
Killaghtee
Killea
Killybegs Lower
Killybegs Upper
Killygarvan
Killymard
Kilmacrennan
Kilteevoge
Leck
Lettermacward
Mevagh
Mintiaghs or Barr of Inch
Moville Lower
Moville Upper
Muff
Raphoe
Raymoghy
Raymunterdoney
Stranorlar
Taughboyne
Templecarn
Temple crone
Tullaghobegly
Tullyfern
Urney

Down
There are 69 civil parishes in County Down:

Aghaderg
Annaclone  
Annahilt  
Ardglass
Ardkeen
Ardquin
Ballee  
Ballyculter
Ballyhalbert alias St. Andrews  
Ballykinler
Ballyphilip
Ballytrustan
Ballywalter
Bangor
Blaris
Bright
Castleboy
Clonallan
Clonduff
Comber
Donaghadee
Donaghcloney
Donaghmore
Down
Dromara
Dromore
Drumballyroney
Drumbeg
Drumbo  
Drumgath
Drumgooland
Dundonald  
Dunsfort  
Garvaghy
Greyabbey
Hillsborough
Holywood
Inch
Inishargy
Kilbroney
Kilclief
Kilcoo
Kilkeel
Killaney
Killinchy
Killyleagh
Kilmegan
Kilmood
Kilmore
Lambeg
Loughinisland
Maghera
Magheradrool
Magheralin
Magherally
Moira
Newry
Newtown Ards
Rathmullan
Saintfield
Saul
Seapatrick
Shankill
Slanes
Tullylish
Tullynakill
Tyrella
Warrenspoint
Witter

Dublin
There are 83 civil parishes in County Dublin:

Aderrig
Artaine
Baldongan
Baldoyle
Balgriffin
Ballyboghil
Ballyfermot
Ballymadun
Balrothery
Balscaddan
Booterstown
Castleknock
Chapelizod
Cloghran, Castleknock
Cloghran, Coolock
Clondalkin
Clonmethan
Clonsilla
Clontarf
Clonturk
Coolock
Cruagh
Crumlin
Dalkey
Donabate
Donnybrook
Drimnagh
Esker
Finglas
Garristown
Glasnevin
Grallagh
Grangegorman
Hollywood
Holmpatrick
Howth
Kilbarrack
Kilbride
Kilgobbin
Kill
Killeek
Killester
Killiney
Killossery
Kilmactalway
Kilmacud
Kilmahuddrick
Kilsallaghan
Kiltiernan
Kinsaley
Leixlip
Lucan
Lusk
Malahide
Monkstown
Mulhuddart
Naul
Newcastle
Oldconnaught
Palmerstown
Portmarnock
Portraine
Raheny
Rathcoole
Rathfarnham
Rathmichael
Saggart
Santry
St. Margarets
St. Peters
Stillorgan
Swords
Tallaght
Taney
Tully
Ward
Westpalstown
Whitechurch

City of Dublin

St. Catherines
St. Georges
St. James
St. Marks
St. Nicholas Without

Fermanagh
There are 22 civil parishes in County Fermanagh

Aghalurcher (also Co. Tyrone)
Aghavea
Belleek
Boho
Cleenish
Clones (also Co. Monaghan)
Derrybrusk
Derryvullan
Devenish
Drumkeeran
Drummully (also Co. Monaghan)
Enniskillen
Galloon
Inishmacsaint (also Co. Donegal)
Killesher
Kinawley
Magheracross
Magheraculmoney
Rossorry
Templecarn
Tomregan
Trory

Galway
There are 120 civil parishes in County Galway:

Abbeygormacan
Abbeyknockmoy
Addergoole
Ahascragh
Annaghdown
Ardrahan
Athenry
Athleague
Aughrim
Ballinchalla
Ballindoon
Ballinrobe
Ballymacward
Ballynacourty
Ballynakill (Ballymoe)
Ballynakill (Ballynahinch)
Ballynakill (Killian)
Ballynakill (Leitrim)
Beagh
Belclare
Boyounagh
Bullaun
Cargin
Claregalway
Clonbern
Clonfert
Clonkeen
Clonrush
Clontuskert
Cong
Cummer
Donaghpatrick
Donanaghta
Drumacoo
Drumatemple
Dunamon
Duniry
Dunmore
Fahy
Fohanagh
Grange
Inishcaltra
Inisheer
Inishman
Inishmore
Isertkelly
Kilbarron
Kilbeacanty
Kilbegnet
Kilbennan
Kilchreest
Kilcloony
Kilcolgan
Kilconickny
Kilconierin
Kilconla
Kilconnell
Kilcooly
Kilcoona
Kilcroan
Kilcummin
Kilgerrill
Kilkerrin
Kilkilvery
Killaan
Killallaghtan
Killannin
Killeany
Killeely
Killeenadeema
Killeenavarra
Killeeneen
Killererin
Killeroran
Killian
Killimorbologue
Killimordaly
Killinan
Killinny
Killogilleen
Killora
Killoran
Killoscobe
Killosolan
Killower
Killursa
Kilmacduagh
Kilmalinoge
Kilmeen
Kilmoylan
Kilquain
Kilreekill
Kiltartan
Kilteskill
Kilthomas
Kiltormer
Kiltullagh
Kinvarradoorus
Lackagh
Leitrim
Lickerrig
Lickmolassy
Liskeevy
Loughrea
Meelick
Monivea
Moycullen
Moylough
Moyrus
Omey
Oranmore
Rahoon
Ross
St. Nicholas
Stradbally
Taghboy
Templetogher
Tiranascragh
Tuam
Tynagh

Kerry
There are 87 civil parishes in County Kerry:

Aghadoe
Aghavallen
Aglish
Annagh
Ardfert
Ballincuslane
Ballinvoher
Ballyconry
Ballyduff
Ballyheige
Ballymacelligott
Ballynacourty
Ballynahaglish
Ballyseedy
Brosna
Caher
Castleisland
Cloghane
Clogherbrien
Currans
Dingle
Dromod
Duagh
Dunquin
Dunurlin
Dysert (Listowel)
Dysert (Trughanacmy)
Fenit
Finuge
Galey
Garfinny
Glanbehy
Kenmare
Kilbonane
Kilcaragh
Kilcaskan
Kilcolman
Kilconly
Kilcredane
Kilcrohane
Kilcummin
Kildrum
Kilfeighny
Kilflyn
Kilgarrylander
Kilgarvan
Kilgobban
Killaha
Killahan
Killarney
Killeentierna
Killehenny
Killemlagh
Killinane
Killiney
Killorglin
Killury
Kilmalkedar
Kilmoyly
Kilnanare
Kilnaughtin
Kilquane
Kilshenane
Kiltallagh
Kiltomy
Kinard
Knockane
Knockanure
Lisselton
Listowel
Marhin
Minard
Molahiffe
Murher
Nohaval
Nohavaldaly
O Brennan
O Dorney
Prior
Ratass
Rattoo
Stradbally
Templenoe
Tralee
Tuosist
Valencia
Ventry

Kildare
There currently appear to be 113 civil parishes in County Kildare. This includes two civil parishes named Cloncurry, two named Nurney, and two named Tully. Before 1881, there were also civil parishes of Ballybought, Coughlanstown and Jago.

Other sources treat Cloncurry, Nurney and Tully all as one civil parish each. Additionally, some include the civil parishes that no longer exist.

Current

Ardkill
Ardree
Ballaghmoon
Ballybrackan
Ballymany
Ballymore Eustace
Ballynadrumny
Ballynafagh
Ballysax
Ballyshannon
Balraheen
Belan
Bodenstown
Brannockstown
Brideschurch
Cadamstown
Carbury
Carn
Carnalway
Carragh
Carrick
Castledermot
Castledillon
Churchtown
Clane
Clonaghlis
Cloncurry
Cloncurry
Clonshanbo
Confey
Davidstown
Donadea
Donaghcumper
Donaghmore
Downings
Duneany
Dunfierth
Dunmanoge
Dunmurraghill
Dunmurry
Feighcullen
Fontstown
Forenaghts
Gilltown
Graney
Grangeclare
Grangerosnolvan
Greatconnell
Harristown
Haynestown
Johnstown
Kerdiffstown
Kilberry
Kilcock
Kilcullen
Kildangan
Kildare
Kildrought
Kilkea
Kill
Killadoon
Killashee
Killelan
Killybegs
Kilmacredock
Kilmeage
Kilmore
Kilpatrick
Kilrainy
Kilrush
Kilteel
Kineagh
Knavinstown
Lackagh
Ladytown
Laraghbryan
Leixlip
Lullymore
Lyons
Mainham
Monasterevin
Moone
Morristownbiller
Mylerstown
Naas
Narraghmore
Nurney
Nurney
Oldconnell
Oughterard
Painestown
Pollardstown
Rathangan
Rathernan
Rathmore
Scullogestown
Sherlockstown
St. Johns
St. Michaels
Stacumny
Straffan
Taghadoe
Tankardstown
Thomastown
Timahoe
Timolin
Tipper
Tipperkevin
Tully
Tully
Usk
Walterstown
Whitechurch

Previous

Ballybought
Coghlanstown
Jago

Kilkenny
There are 140 civil parishes in County Kilkenny:

Abbeyleix
Aghaviller
Aglish
Aharney
Arderra
Attanagh
Balleen
Ballinamara
Ballybur
Ballycallan
Ballygurrim
Ballylarkin
Ballylinch
Ballytarsney
Ballytobin
Blackrath
Blanchvilleskill
Borrismore
Burnchurch
Callan
Castlecomer
Castleinch or Inchyolaghan
Clara
Clashacrow
Clomantagh
Clonamery
Clonmore
Columbkille
Coolaghmore
Coolcashin
Coolcraheen
Danesfort
Derrynahinch
Donaghmore
Dunbell
Dungarvan
Dunkitt
Dunmore
Dunnamaggan
Durrow
Dysart
Dysartmoon
Earlstown
Ennisnag
Erke
Famma
Fertagh
Fiddown
Freshford
Garranamanagh
Gaulskill
Glashare
Gowran
Graiguenamanagh
Grange
Grangekilree
Grangemaccomb
Grangesilvia
Inistioge
Jerpoint West
Jerpointabbey
Jerpointchurch
Kells
Kilbeacon
Kilbride
Kilcoan
Kilcolumb
Kilcooly
Kilderry
Kilfane
Kilferagh
Kilkeasy
Kilkieran
Killahy (Crannagh)
Killahy (Knocktopher)
Killaloe
Killamery
Killarney
Kilmacahill
Kilmacar
Kilmacow
Kilmademoge
Kilmadum
Kilmaganny
Kilmakevoge
Kilmanagh
Kilmenan
Kilree
Knocktopher
Lismateige
Listerlin
Mallardstown
Mayne
Mothell
Muckalee (Fassadinin)
Muckalee (Knocktopher)
Odagh
Outrath
Owning
Pleberstown
Pollrone
Portnascully
Powerstown
Rathaspick
Rathbeagh
Rathcoole
Rathkieran
Rathlogan
Rathpatrick
Rosbercon
Rosconnell
Rossinan
Shanbogh
Shankill
Sheffin
St. Canice
St. Johns
St. Martins
St. Marys
St. Mauls
St. Patricks
Stonecarthy
The Rower
Thomastown
Tibberaghny
Tiscoffin
Treadingstown
Tubbrid
Tubbridbritain
Tullaghanbrogue
Tullaherin
Tullahought
Tullamaine
Tullaroan
Ullard
Ullid
Urlingford
Wells
Whitechurch
Woolengrange

Laois
There are 53 civil parishes in County Laois:

Abbeyleix
Aghaboe
Aghmacart
Aharney
Ardea
Attanagh
Ballyadams
Ballyroan
Bordwell
Borris
Castlebrack
Clonenagh and Clonagheen
Cloydagh
Coolbanagher
Coolkerry
Curraclone
Donaghmore
Durrow
Dysartenos
Dysartgallen
Erke
Fossy or Timahoe
Glashare
Kilcolmanbane
Kilcolmanbrack
Kildellig
Killabban
Killenny
Killermogh
Killeshin
Kilmanman
Kilteale
Kyle
Lea
Monksgrange
Moyanna
Offerlane
Rathaspick
Rathdowney
Rathsaran
Rearymore
Rosconnell
Rosenallis
Shrule
Skirk
Sleaty
St. Johns
Straboe
Stradbally
Tankardstown
Tecolm
Timogue
Tullomoy

Leitrim
There are 17 civil parishes in County Leitrim:

Annaduff
Carrigallen
Cloonclare
Cloone
Cloonlogher
Drumlease
Drumreilly
Fenagh
Inishmagrath
Killanummery
Killarga
Killasnet
Kiltoghert
Kiltubbrid
Mohill
Oughteragh
Rossinver

Limerick
There are 130 civil parishes in County Limerick:

Abbeyfeale
Abington
Adare
Aglishcormick
Anhid
Ardagh
Ardcanny
Ardpatrick
Askeaton
Athlacca
Athneasy
Ballinard
Ballingaddy
Ballingarry (Connello)
Ballingarry (Coshlea)
Ballinlough
Ballybrood
Ballycahane
Ballylanders
Ballynaclogh
Ballynamona
Ballyscaddan
Bruff
Bruree
Caheravally
Caherconlish
Cahercorney
Caherelly
Cahernarry
Cappagh
Carrigparson
Castletown
Chapelrussell
Clonagh
Cloncagh
Cloncrew
Clonelty
Clonkeen
Clonshire
Colmanswell
Corcomohide
Crecora
Croagh
Croom
Darragh
Derrygalvin
Donaghmore
Doon
Doondonnell
Drehidtarsna
Dromcolliher
Dromin
Dromkeen
Dunmoylan
Dysert
Effin
Emlygrennan
Fedamore
Galbally
Glenogra
Grange 
Grean
Hackmys
Hospital
Inch St. Lawrence
Iveruss
Kilbeheny
Kilbolane
Kilbradran
Kilbreedy Major
Kilbreedy Minor
Kilcolman
Kilcornan
Kilcullane
Kildimo
Kilfergus
Kilfinnane
Kilfinny
Kilflyn
Kilfrush
Kilkeedy
Killagholehane
Killeedy
Killeely
Killeenagarriff
Killeenoghty
Killonahan
Kilmeedy
Kilmoylan
Kilmurry
Kilpeacon
Kilquane
Kilscannell
Kilteely
Knockainy
Knocklong
Knocknagaul
Lismakeery
Loghill
Ludden
Mahoonagh
Monagay
Monasteranenagh
Morgans
Mungret
Nantinan
Newcastle
Oola
Particles
Rathjordan
Rathkeale
Rathronan
Robertstown
Rochestown
Shanagolden
St. Peters and St. Pauls
St. John's
St Lawrences
St Michael's
St Munchins
St Nicholas
St. Patrick's
Stradbally
Tankardstown
Templebredon
Tomdeely
Tullabracky
Tuogh
Tuoghcluggin
Uregare

Londonderry
There are 45 civil parishes in County Londonderry:

Aghadowey
Aghanloo
Agivey
Arboe
Artrea
Ballinderry
Ballyaghran
Ballymoney
Ballynascreen
Ballyrashane
Ballyscullion
Ballywillin
Balteagh
Banagher
Bovevagh
Carrick
Clondermot
Coleraine
Cumber Lower
Cumber Upper
Derryloran
Desertlyn
Desertmartin
Desertoghill
Drumachose
Dunboe
Dungiven
Errigal
Faughanvale
Kilcronaghan
Kildollagh
Killelagh
Killowen
Kilrea
Learmount
Lissan
Macosquin
Maghera
Magherafelt
Magilligan
Tamlaght
Tamlaght Finlagan
Tamlaght O Crilly
Templemore
Termoneeny

Longford
There are 26 civil parishes in County Longford:

Abbeylara
Abbeyshrule
Agharra
Ardagh
Ballymacormick
Cashel
Clonbroney
Clongesh
Columbkille
Forgney
Granard
Kilcommock
Kilglass
Killashee
Killoe
Mohill
Mostrim
Moydow
Noughaval
Rathcline
Rathreagh
Shrule
Street
Taghsheenod
Taghshinny
Templemichael

Louth
There are 63 civil parishes in County Louth:

Ardee
Ballybarrack
Ballyboys
Ballymakenny
Ballymascanlan
Barronstown
Beaulieu
Cappoge
Carlingford
Carrickbaggot
Castletown
Charlestown
Clogher
Clonkeehan
Clonkeen
Clonmore
Collon
Creggan
Darver
Dromin
Dromiskin
Drumcar
Drumshallon
Dunany
Dunbin
Dundalk
Dunleer
Dysart
Faughart
Gernonstown
Haggardstown
Haynestown
Inishkeen
Kane
Kildemock
Killanny
Killincoole
Kilsaran
Louth
Mansfieldstown
Mapastown
Marlestown
Mayne
Monasterboice
Mosstown
Mullary
Parsonstown
Philipstown
Philipstown district
Philipstown-Nugent
Port
Rathdrumin
Richardstown
Roche
Salterstown
Shanlis
Smarmore
St. Peters
Stabannan
Stickillin
Tallanstown
Termonfeckin
Tullyallen

Mayo
There are 73 civil parishes in County Mayo:

Achill
Addergoole
Aghagower
Aghamore
Aglish
Annagh
Ardagh
Attymass
Balla
Ballinchalla
Ballinrobe
Ballintober
Ballyhean
Ballynahaglish
Ballyovey
Ballysakeery
Bekan
Bohola
Breaghwy
Burriscarra
Burrishoole
Castlemore
Claddy
Cong
Crossboyne
Crossmolina
Doonfeeny
Drum
Inishbofin
Islandeady
Kilbeagh
Kilbelfad
Kilbride
Kilcolman (Clanmorris)
Kilcolman (Costello)
Kilcommon (Erris)
Kilcommon (Kilmaine)
Kilconduff
Kilcummin
Kildacommoge
Kilfian
Kilgarvan
Kilgeever
Killala
Killasser
Killedan
Kilmaclasser
Kilmainebeg
Kilmainemore
Kilmeena
Kilmolara
Kilmore
Kilmoremoy
Kilmovee
Kilturra
Kilvine
Knock
Lackan
Manulla
Mayo
Meelick
Moorgagagh
Moygawnagh
Oughaval
Rathreagh
Robeen
Rosslee
Shrule
Tagheen
Templemore
Templemurry
Toomore
Touaghty
Turlough

Meath
There are 146 civil parishes in County Meath:

Agher
Ardagh
Ardbraccan
Ardcath
Ardmulchan
Ardsallagh
Assey
Athboy
Athlumney
Balfeaghan
Ballyboggan
Ballygarth
Ballymagarvey
Ballymaglassan
Balrathboyne
Balsoon
Bective
Brownstown
Burry
Castlejordan
Castlerickard
Castletown
Churchtown
Clonalvy
Clonard
Clongill
Clonmacduff
Collon
Colp
Cookstown
Crickstown
Cruicetown
Culmullin
Cushinstown
Danestown
Derrypatrick
Diamor
Donaghmore (Navan)
Donaghmore (Ratoath)
Donaghpatrick
Donore
Dowdstown
Dowth
Drakestown
Drumcondra
Drumlargan
Dulane
Duleek
Duleek Abbey
Dunboyne
Dunmoe
Dunsany
Dunshaughlin
Emlagh
Enniskeen
Fennor
Follistown
Gallow
Galtrim
Gernonstown
Girley
Grangegeeth
Greenoge
Inishmot
Julianstown
Kells
Kentstown
Kilbeg
Kilberry
Kilbrew
Kilbride (Dunboyne)
Kilbride (Fore)
Kilcarn
Kilclone
Kilcooly
Kildalkey
Killaconnigan
Killallon
Killary
Killeagh
Killeen
Killegland
Killyon
Kilmainham
Kilmessan
Kilmoon
Kilmore
Kilsharvan
Kilshine
Kilskeer
Kiltale
Knock
Knockcommon
Knockmark
Laracor
Liscartan
Lismullin
Loughan or Castlekeeran
Loughbrackan
Loughcrew
Macetown
Martry
Mitchelstown
Monknewtown
Monktown
Moorechurch
Moybolgue
Moyglare
Moylagh
Moymet
Moynalty
Navan
Newtown
Newtownclonbun
Nobber
Oldcastle
Painstown
Piercetown
Rataine
Rathbeggan
Rathcore
Rathfeigh
Rathkenny
Rathmolyon
Rathmore
Rathregan
Ratoath
Rodanstown
Scurlockstown
Siddan
Skreen
Slane
St. Marys
Stackallan
Staholmog
Stamullin
Straffordstown
Tara
Teltown
Templekeeran
Timoole
Trevet
Trim
Trubley
Tullaghanoge
Tullyallen

Monaghan
There are 23 civil parishes in County Monaghan:

Aghabog
Aughnamullen
Ballybay
Clones
Clontibret
Currin
Donagh
Donaghmoyne
Drummully
Drumsnat
Ematris
Errigal Trough
Inishkeen
Killanny
Killeevan
Kilmore
Magheracloone
Magheross
Monaghan
Muckno
Tydavnet
Tehallan
Tullycorbet

Offaly
There are 51 civil parishes in County Offaly:

Aghancon 
Ardnurcher or Horseleap
Ballyboy 
Ballyburly 
Ballycommon 
Ballykean 
Ballymacwilliam 
Ballynakill 
Birr 
Borrisnafarney 
Castlejordan 
Castletownely 
Clonmacnoise 
Clonsast 
Clonyhurk 
Corbally 
Croghan 
Cullenwaine 
Drumcullen 
Dunkerrin 
Durrow
Eglish 
Ettagh 
Finglas 
Gallen 
Geashill 
Kilbride (Ballycowan) 
Kilbride (Kilcoursey) 
Kilclonfert 
Kilcolman 
Kilcomin 
Kilcumreragh 
Killaderry 
Killoughy 
Kilmanaghan 
Kilmurryely 
Kinnitty 
Lemanaghan 
Letterluna 
Lusmagh 
Lynally 
Monasteroris 
Rahan 
Reynagh 
Roscomroe 
Roscrea 
Seirkieran 
Shinrone 
Templeharry 
Tisaran 
Wheery or Killagally

Roscommon
There are 60 civil parishes in County Roscommon:

Ardcarn
Athleague
Aughrim
Ballintober
Ballynakill
Baslick
Boyle
Bumlin
Cam
Castlemore
Clooncraff
Cloonfinlough
Cloontuskert
Cloonygormican
Creagh
Creeve
Drum
Drumatemple
Dunamon
Dysart
Elphin
Estersnow
Fuerty
Kilbride
Kilbryan
Kilcolagh
Kilcolman
Kilcooley
Kilcorkey
Kilgefin
Kilglass
Kilkeevin
Killinvoy
Killukin (Boyle)
Killukin (Roscommon)
Killummod
Kilmacumsy
Kilmeane
Kilmore
Kilnamanagh
Kilronan
Kilteevan
Kiltoom
Kiltrustan
Kiltullagh
Lissonuffy
Moore
Ogulla
Oran
Rahara
Roscommon
Shankill
St. Johns
St. Peters
Taghboy
Taghmaconnell
Termonbarry
Tibohine
Tisrara
Tumna

Sligo
There are 41 civil parishes in County Sligo:

Achonry
Aghanagh
Ahamlish
Ballynakill
Ballysadare
Ballysumaghan
Calry
Castleconor
Cloonoghil
Dromard
Drumcliff
Drumcolumb
Drumrat
Easky
Emlaghfad
Kilcolman
Kilfree
Kilglass
Killadoon
Killaraght
Killaspugbrone
Killerry
Killoran
Kilmacallan
Kilmacowen
Kilmacshalgan
Kilmacteige
Kilmactranny
Kilmoremoy
Kilmorgan
Kilross
Kilshalvy
Kilturra
Kilvarnet
Rossinver
Shancough
Skreen
St. Johns
Tawnagh
Templeboy
Toomour

Tipperary
There are 193 civil parishes in County Tipperary:

Abington
Aghacrew
Aghnameadle
Aglishcloghane
Ardcroney
Ardfinnan
Ardmayle
Athnid
Ballingarry (Ormond Lr)
Ballingarry (Slieveardagh)
Ballintemple
Ballybacon
Ballycahill
Ballyclerahan
Ballygibbon
Ballygriffin
Ballymackey
Ballymoreen
Ballynaclogh
Ballysheehan
Baptistgrange
Barnane-ely
Barrettsgrange
Borrisnafarney
Borrisokane
Bourney
Boytonrath
Brickendown
Bruis
Buolick
Burgesbeg
Caher
Carrick
Castletownarra
Clogher
Cloghprior
Clonbeg
Clonbullogue
Cloneen
Clonoulty
Clonpet
Colman
Cooleagh
Coolmundry
Corbally
Cordangan
Corroge
Crohane
Cullen
Cullenwaine
Dangandargan
Derrygrath
Dogstown
Dolla
Donaghmore
Donohill
Doon
Dorrha
Drom
Drangan
Dromineer
Emly
Erry
Fennor
Fertiana
Fethard
Finnoe
Gaile
Galbooly
Garrangibbon
Glenbane
Glenkeen
Grangemockler
Graystown
Holycross
Horeabbey
Inch
Inishlounaght
Isertkieran
Kilbarron
Kilbragh
Kilcash
Kilclonagh
Kilcomenty
Kilconnell
Kilcooly
Kilcornan
Kilfeacle
Kilfithmone
Kilgrant
Kilkeary
Killaloan
Killardry
Killavinoge
Killea
Killeenasteena
Killenaule
Killodiernan
Killoscully
Killoskehan
Kilmastulla
Kilmore (Kilnamanagh)
Kilmucklin
Kilmurry
Kilmore (Ormond)
Kilnaneave
Kilnarath
Kilpatrick
Kilruane
Kilshane
Kilsheelan
Kiltegan
Kiltinan
Kilvellane
Kilvemnon
Knigh
Knockgraffon
Latteragh
Lattin
Lickfinn
Lisbunny
Lismalin
Lisronagh
Lorrha
Loughkeen
Loughmoe East
Loughmoe West
Magorban
Magowry
Modeshil
Modreeny
Molough
Monsea
Mora
Mortlestown
Mowney
Moyaliff
Moycarky
Moyne
Neddans
Nenagh
Newcastle
Newchapel
Newtownlennan
Oughterleague
Outeragh
Peppardstown
Rahelty
Railstown
Rathcool
Rathkennan
Rathlynin
Rathnaveoge
Rathronan
Redcity
Relickmurry and Athassel
Rochestown
Roscrea
Shanrahan
Shronell
Shyane
Solloghodbeg
Solloghodmore
St. John Baptist
St. Johnstown
St. Marys, Clonmel
St. Patricksrock
Templeachally
Templebeg
Templebredon
Templederry
Templedowney
Temple-etney
Templemichael
Templemore
Templeneiry
Templenoe
Templeree
Templetenny
Templetouhy
Terryglass
Thurles
Tipperary
Toem
Tubbrid
Tullaghmelan
Tullaghorton
Tullamain
Two-Mile Borris
Upperchurch
Uskane
Whitechurch
Youghalarra

Tyrone
There are 46 civil parishes in County Tyrone:

Aghaloo
Arboe
Ardstraw 
Artrea (Tyrone portion) 
Ballinderry
Ballyclog
Bodoney Lower
Bodoney Upper
Camus
Cappagh  
Carnteel
Clogher
Clogherny
Clonfeacle (Tyrone portion)
Clonoe
Derryloran (Tyrone portion)
Desertcreat 
Donacavey
Donaghedy
Donaghenry
Donaghmore
Dromore
Drumglass
Drumragh
Errigal Keerogue
Errigal Trough (Tyrone portion)
Kildress
Killeeshil
Killyman
Kilskeery
Learmount (Tyrone portion)
Leckpatrick
Lissan (Tyrone portion) 
Longfield East 
Magheracross 
Pomeroy 
Tamlaght 
Termonamongan
Termonmaguirk 
Tullyniskan
Urney (Tyrone portion)
West Longfield

Waterford
There are 74 civil parishes in County Waterford:

Affane
Aglish
Ardmore
Ballygunner
Ballylaneen
Ballymacart
Ballynakill
Clashmore
Clonagam
Clonea
Colligan
Corbally
Crooke
Drumcannon
Dungarvan
Dunhill
Dysert
Faithlegg
Fenoagh
Fews
Guilcagh
Inishlounaght
Islandikane
Kilbarry
Kilbarrymeaden
Kilbride
Kilburne
Kilcaragh
Kilcockan
Kilcop
Kilculliheen
Kilgobnet
Kill St. Lawrence
Kill St. Nicholas
Killaloan
Killea
Killoteran
Killure
Kilmacleague
Kilmacomb
Kilmeadan
Kilmolash
Kilmoleran
Kilronan (Glenahiry)
Kilronan (Middlethird)
Kilrossanty
Kilrush
Kilsheelan
Kilwatermoy
Kinsalebeg
Leitrim
Lickoran
Lisgenan or Grange
Lismore and Mocollop
Lisnakill
Modelligo
Monamintra
Monksland
Mothel
Newcastle
Rathgormuck
Rathmoylan
Reisk
Ringagonagh
Rossduff
Rossmire
Seskinan
St. Johns Without
St. Marys Clonmel
Stradbally
Tallow
Templemichael
Trinity Without
Whitechurch

Westmeath
There are 63 civil parishes in County Westmeath:

Ardnurcher or Horseleap
Ballyloughloe
Ballymore
Ballymorin
Bunown
Carrick
Castlelost
Castletownkindalen
Churchtown
Clonarney
Clonfad
Conry
Delvin or Castletowndelvin
Drumraney
Durrow
Dysart
Enniscoffey
Faughalstown
Foyran
Kilbeggan
Kilbixy
Kilbride
Kilcleagh
Kilcumny
Kilcumreragh
Kilkenny West
Killagh
Killare
Killua
Killucan
Killulagh
Kilmacnevan
Kilmanaghan
Kilpatrick
Lackan
Leny
Lickbla
Lynn
Mayne
Moylisker
Mullingar
Multyfarnham
Newtown
Noughaval
Pass of Kilbride
Piercetown
Portloman
Portnashangan
Rahugh
Rathaspick
Rathconnell
Rathconrath
Rathgarve
Russagh
St. Feighin's
St. Mary's, Fore
St. Marys, Athlone
Stonehall
Street
Taghmon
Templeoran
Templepatrick
Tyfarnham

Wexford
There are over 135 civil parishes in County Wexford:

Adamstown
Ambrosetown
Ardamine
Ardcandrisk
Ardcavan
Ardcolm
Artramon
Ballingly
Ballyanne
Ballybrazil
Ballybrennan
Ballycanew
Ballycarney
Ballyconnick
Ballyhoge
Ballyhuskard
Ballylannan
Ballymitty
Ballymore
Ballynaslaney
Ballyvaldon
Ballyvalloo
Bannow
Carn
Carnagh
Carnew
Carrick
Castle-ellis
Chapel
Clone
Clongeen
Clonleigh
Clonmines
Clonmore
Coolstuff
Crosspatrick
Donaghmore
Doonooney
Drinagh
Duncormick
Edermine
Ferns
Fethard
Hook
Horetown
Inch (Gorey)
Inch (Shelmaliere)
Ishartmon
Kerloge
Kilbride
Kilbrideglynn
Kilcavan
Kilcomb
Kilcormick
Kilcowan
Kilcowanmore
Kildavin
Kilgarvan
Kilgorman
Killag
Killann
Killegney
Killenagh
Killesk
Killiane
Killila
Killincooly
Killinick
Killisk
Killurin
Kilmacree
Kilmakilloge
Kilmallock
Kilmannan
Kilmokea
Kilmore
Kilmuckridge
Kilnahue
Kilnamanagh
Kilnenor
Kilpatrick
Kilpipe
Kilrane
Kilrush
Kilscanlan
Kilscoran
Kiltennell
Kiltrisk
Kilturk
Ladysisland
Liskinfere
Maudlintown
Mayglass
Meelnagh
Monamolin
Monart
Moyacomb
Mulrankin
Newbawn
Oldross
Owenduff
Rathaspick
Rathmacknee
Rathroe
Rossdroit
Rosslare
Rossminoge
Skreen
St. Bridgets
St. Doologues
St. Helens
St. Iberius
St. James and Dunbrody
St. Johns (Bantry)
St. Johns, Wexford
St. Mar s, Wexford
St. Margare s (Shelmaliere)
St. Margarets (Forth)
St. Marys Enniscorthy
St. Marys Newtownbarry
St. Marys, New Ross
St. Michaels
St. Michaels of Feagh
St. Mullins
St. Nicholas
St. Patricks
St. Peters
St. Selskars
Tacumshin
Taghmon
Tellarought
Templeludigan
Templescoby
Templeshanbo
Templeshannon
Templetown
Tikillin
Tintern
Tomhaggard
Toome
Whitechurch
Whitechurchglynn

Wicklow

There are over 59 civil parishes in County Wicklow:

Aghowle
Ardoyne
Arklow
Ballinacor
Ballintemple
Ballykine
Ballynure
Baltinglass
Blessington
Boystown
Bray
Burgage
Calary
Carnew
Castlemacadam
Crecrin
Crehelp
Crosspatrick
Delgany
Derrylossary
Donaghmore
Donard
Drumkay
Dunganstown
Dunlavin
Ennereilly
Freynestown
Glenealy
Hacketstown
Hollywood
Inch
Kilbride (Arklow)
Kilbride (Talbotstown)
Kilcommon (Arklow)
Kilcommon (Ballinacor)
Kilcoole
Killahurler
Killiskey
Kilmacanoge
Kilpipe
Kilpoole
Kilranelagh
Kiltegan
Knockrath
Liscolman
Moyacomb
Moyne
Mullinacuff
Newcastle-Lower
Newcastle-Upper
Powerscourt
Preban
Rathbran
Rathdrum
Rathnew
Rathsallagh
Rathtoole
Redcross
Tober

References

 
Civil parishes